The National Security Strategy (NSS) is a document prepared periodically by the executive branch of the United States that lists the national security concerns and how the administration plans to deal with them. The legal foundation for the document is spelled out in the Goldwater–Nichols Act. The document is purposely general in content, and its implementation relies on elaborating guidance provided in supporting documents such as the National Military Strategy.

Purposes of the NSS report

The stated intent of the Goldwater–Nichols legislation is broadly accepted as valid for effective political discourse on issues affecting the nation's security—the Congress and the Executive need a common understanding of the strategic environment and the administration's intent as a starting point for future dialogue. That said, however, it is understood that in the adversarial environment that prevails, this report can only provide a beginning point for the dialogue necessary to reach such a "common" understanding.

The requirement of producing this report along with the budget request leads to an iterative, interagency process involving high level meetings that helps to resolve internal differences in foreign policy agendas. However, "this report was not to be a neutral planning document, as many academics and even some in uniform think it to be. Rather it was ... intended to serve five primary purposes."

 Communicate the Executive's strategic vision to Congress, and thus legitimize its requests for resources.
 Communicate the Executive's strategic vision to foreign constituencies, especially governments not on the US's summit agenda.
 Communicate with select domestic audiences, such as political supporters seeking Presidential recognition of their issues, and those who hope to see a coherent and farsighted strategy they could support.
 Create internal consensus on foreign and defense policy within the executive branch.
 Contribute to the overall agenda of the President, both in terms of substance and messaging.

Where the incoming executive team has not formulated a national security strategy, such as an after an election in which foreign policy and defense were not important campaign issues, the process of writing the report can be of immense importance:
Few things educate new political appointees faster as to their own strategic sensings, or to the qualities and competencies of the "permanent" government they lead within executive bureaucracies, than to have to commit in writing to the President their plans for the future and how they can be integrated, coordinated and otherwise shared with other agencies and departments. The ability to forge consensus among these competing views on direction, priorities and pace, and getting "on board" important players three political levels down from the president is recognized as an invaluable, if not totally daunting, opportunity for a new administration.

History

2002 NSS
The National Security Strategy issued on September 17, 2002, contained the controversial Bush doctrine of pre-emptive war. It also contained the notion of military pre-eminence that was reflected in a 1992 Department of Defense paper, "Defense Policy Guidance", prepared by two principal authors (Paul Wolfowitz and I. Lewis Libby) working under Defense Secretary Dick Cheney. The NSS 2002 repeated and re-emphasized efforts to provide foreign aid to countries moving towards Western-style democracy, with the "ambitious and specific target" of "doubl[ing] the size of the world's poorest economies within a decade."

The Bush doctrine reflected an effort to move from the Cold War doctrine of deterrence to one that could deal with terrorist groups such as al-Qaeda as well as nation-states such as Iraq or Iran.

The document also treated AIDS as a threat to national security, promising efforts to reduce its spread and devastating effects.

2006 NSS
Published in March 2006, the final Bush White House NSS said it was based on two "pillars": "promoting freedom, justice, and human dignity" and "leading a growing community of democracies."

2010 NSS
On May 26, 2010, President Barack Obama. issued a new Strategy which was called by United Nations ambassador Susan Rice a "dramatic departure" from its predecessor. The Strategy advocated increased engagement with Russia, China and India. The Strategy also identified nuclear non-proliferation and climate change as priorities, while noting that the United States's security depended on reviving its economy. The drafters of the new Strategy made a conscious decision to remove terms such as "Islamic radicalism", instead speaking of terrorism generally.

The 2010 NSS said that in order to defeat al Qaeda and the Taliban in Afghanistan, the United States needs to engage in a large amount of interagency cooperation and communication with the Muslim population in Afghanistan and throughout the world. The objective of the National Security Strategy is to create a stable situation for the world, including those countries struggling with insurgencies. "The most effective long-term measure for conflict and resolution is the promotion of democracy and economic development." In order to promote democracy and economic development communication with the civilian population of the host-nation is essential.  The Stability Operations Field Manual states that success depends on a U.S. ability to build local institutions and in the establishment of a legitimate permanent government, which builds trust between the citizens and the counterinsurgency personnel." The National Security Strategy establishes the interagency coordination in order to conduct useful public diplomacy to secure the population in the countries of Afghanistan and Iraq.

2015 NSS
On February 6, 2015, Obama issued a new NSS to provide "a vision and strategy for advancing the nation's interests, universal values, and a rules-based international order through strong and sustainable American leadership."

2017 NSS
The primary author of the 2017 National Security Strategy (NSS) was Nadia Schadlow, then-deputy national security adviser. Her work on the document and the inter-agency process that preceded it were well-received by foreign policy experts across the political spectrum. Delivered by President Donald Trump  on December 18, 2017, the new document named China and Russia as "revisionist powers" while removing "climate change" as a national threat. It also characterized the world as a competitive arena rather than a "community of nations" or "international community" as previous documents had. NSS-2017 represents a break with past foreign policy doctrine. Brad Patty, an author for the conservative think tank Security Studies Group writes that, "My guess is that members of the Foreign Policy elite will encounter these first pages as a kind of boilerplate, even trite. Notice, though, that those two pages lead directly to a third page that repudiates the whole living body of American foreign policy thought."

About a year later, Schadlow would comment that the NSS had "achieved the state of mattering".

2021 NSS

In March 2021, President Joe Biden published the 2021 Interim National Security Strategy (NSS), which recommitted the United States to the NATO alliance and outlined the country's global priorities, concluding that the United States "must demonstrate that democracies can still deliver for our people. It will not happen by accident – we have to defend our democracy, strengthen it and renew it."

2022 NSS

On October 12, 2022, the Biden Administration sent its classified National Security Strategy to Congress. According to an unclassified fact sheet released to the public, the strategy said the U.S. faced two strategic challenges: a post-cold war competition between superpowers and transnational challenges that range from climate change to global health issues. The document said that “the most pressing strategic challenge facing our vision is from powers that layer authoritarian governance with a revisionist foreign policy,” singling out China and Russia as presenting particular but different challenges. 

The 2022 National Security Strategy is organized around three points:

 Invest ambitiously and rapidly in the sources of our national strength.
 Mobilize the broadest coalition of nations to enhance our collective influence.
 Shape the rules of the road of the 21st century economy, from technology, to cyber to trade and economics.

See also
Climate change and national security
National Defense Strategy (NDS) 
Nuclear Posture Review (NPR)
Quadrennial Defense Review (QDR)

References

External links

The National Security Strategy of the United States of America 2002
National Security Strategy Archive, list of reports, 1987-2015
U.S. House of Representatives bill (H.R. 282) to hold the current regime in Iran accountable for its threatening behavior and to support a transition to democracy in Iran.
National Security Strategy 2006
National Security Strategy 2010
2017 National Security Strategy Full PDF
Stability Operations Field Manual FM 3-07 (2008)

In the media
April 16, 2007, The CNA Corporation: National Security and the Threat of Climate Change

United States national security policy
History of the foreign relations of the United States
20th century in the United States
United States defense policymaking
Reports of the United States government